Limerick ham is a particular method of preparing a joint of ham within the cuisine of Ireland. The method was originally developed in County Limerick, Ireland. The main manufacturers were O'Mara. Matterson, Shaws, and Denny.

Preparation
Traditionally, the initial stage in the preparation of a Limerick ham is to smoke it over juniper branches. After this stage, the whole haunches, hams, and other cuts are distributed to butchers, who usually divide these large cuts into smaller portions and may cure the meat prior to sale.

After purchase, a Limerick ham is typically steeped in cold water overnight. Cooking involves boiling in cider, then baking on a very high heat to crisp the fat.

See also

 List of hams
 List of Irish dishes

References

Irish cuisine
Pork dishes
Ham
Bacon